Benjamin Goodwin Seielstad, who worked as B. G. Seielstad, (December 23, 1886 – July 1, 1960) was an American painter and illustrator. He claimed his first job was covering the 1906 San Francisco earthquake. He worked for a variety of newspapers and for Popular Science Monthly in the 1930s before working at Life magazine in the 1940s. He was accorded a great deal of latitude in illustrating articles for Popular Science Monthly on topics such as an automated freeway, a futuristic city, and "How The World Will End".

Early life and family
Benjamin Seielstad was born in Lake Wilson, Minnesota, on December 23, 1886, to Gudbrund Julius Seielstad, a farmer, and his wife Carrie Goodwin Benson. Both had migrated to the United States from Norway. Seielstad married Nathalie Pomeroy around 1912 with whom he had a daughter, Lucile, born in Los Angeles in 1914.

He studied at the Art Students League of New York where one of his contemporaries was Jean Mannheim.

Career
Seielstad claimed his first job was covering the San Francisco Earthquake (1906). He worked as an illustrator for the Los Angeles Examiner and the Los Angeles Times, as well as for the New York Daily News, New York World and the Philadelphia Examiner.

In the 1930s he illustrated numerous articles in Popular Science Monthly for which he produced drawings showing the technical aspects of products such as a cutaway of a pocket watch (1931), as well as others showing forecast and speculative scientific developments such as a future city (1934) based on the ideas of British writer R. H. Wilenski which envisaged cities composed of buildings on slender trunks like trees. The degree of license given to Seielstad in interpreting the article text was reflected in Popular Science'''s comment "our artist presents here his conception of this startling proposal"."City of Treelike Buildings Planned", Popular Science Monthly, April 1934, p. 25.
 
He also drew an automatic freeway (1938) and produced four illustrations for an article titled "How The World Will End" (1939), one of which showed a "giant meteor" about to hit New York City and the city's inhabitants fleeing for their lives:"How The World Will End", Popular Science Monthly, September 1939, pp. 58–59 & 222.

By 1940, Seielstad was working for Life magazine and was pictured at work in their 1940 issue commenting that the events of the Second World War were like his first job covering the San Francisco Earthquake. He described his love of "candid-camera" work to aid him in his drawing and how he used the reader's eye like the lens of a camera, "unfolding a scene before it with his drawings".

Death
Seielstad died at Inglewood, Los Angeles, on July 1, 1960 after a long illness.

 Footnotes 

 References 

External links

"Radio City to Cost $250,000,000" Popular Science Monthly'', September 1930.
https://brookstonbeerbulletin.com/beer-making-is-marvel-of-industrial-chemistry/
https://books.google.com/books?id=QSgDAAAAMBAJ&pg=PA20

1886 births
1960 deaths
Los Angeles Times people
American people of Norwegian descent
People from Minnesota
American magazine illustrators
20th-century American painters
Art Students League of New York alumni